The 2016 NCAA Division II Men's Soccer Championship was the 45th annual single-elimination tournament to determine the national champion of NCAA Division II men's collegiate soccer in the United States. The semifinals and championship game were played at Swope Soccer Village in Kansas City, Missouri from December 1–3, 2016 while the preceding rounds were played at various sites across the country during November 2016.

Qualification
All Division II men's soccer programs were eligible to qualify for the 38-team tournament field. No teams received automatic bids; at-large bids are based on the teams' regular season records and the Quality of Winning Percentage Index. Teams were placed into one of four unbalanced super-regional brackets, consisting of eight or ten teams, based on geographic location.

Tournament bracket
Source:

Super Region No. 1

Super Region No. 2

Super Region No. 3

Super Region No. 4

Division II College Cup

Final

See also 
 NCAA Men's Soccer Championships (Division I, Division III)
 NCAA Women's Soccer Championships (Division I, Division II, Division III)

References

NCAA Division II Men's Soccer Championship
NCAA Division II Men's Soccer Championship
NCAA Division II Men's Soccer Championship
NCAA Division II Men's Soccer Championship
NCAA Division II Men's Soccer Championship